Megan Frazee Leuzinger (born March 29, 1987) is a professional American basketball player. Frazee graduated from Liberty University and played briefly in the Women's National Basketball Association (WNBA). She most recently played for Samsun of the Turkish Women's League, where she averaged 18.7 points and 7.4 rebounds per game. On April 11, 2018 she was named head coach of the Evangel University women's basketball team.

Early life
Frazee was born in Laredo, Texas. She graduated in 2005 from Xenia Christian High School in Xenia, Ohio, where she helped lead the school to a final four appearance.  She was named the Ohio Division 4 player of the year, first team all-state, and was tabbed a Street & Smith's Honorable Mention honoree.

College
Frazee played for coach Carey Green at Liberty University in Lynchburg, Virginia, where she was a teammate with her triplet sisters Moriah and Molly. She was a three-time All-Big South first team selection, was twice named Big South Conference player of the year, and was the Big South Women's Student-Athlete of the Year as a junior. As a senior, she was named to the Associated Press honorable mention All-American team as well as the CoSIDA/ESPN Academic All-America First Team, graduating with a 3.91 GPA in Kinesiology. Frazee was invited to tryouts for the 2007 national team during her sophomore summer and spent time during the summer of 2008 traveling in North Africa with Athletes in Action.

During her senior season Megan averaged 19.8 points and 9.9 rebounds per game, leading Liberty to the NCAA women's basketball tournament.  She possesses career averages at Liberty of 18.5 points and 9.9 rebounds per game. The Flames also qualified for the NCAA tournament during her freshman and sophomore seasons. Her freshman season was cut short to 14 games due to a season ending knee injury.

Liberty statistics
Source

Professional career
Frazee was drafted as a forward by the San Antonio Silver Stars in the second round of the 2009 WNBA Draft.  She was the 14th player taken overall.  During her rookie season she played in 29 games and averaged 5.0 points and 2.9 rebounds.  

Following that first WNBA season she played in the Turkish Women's League for Çankaya Üniversitesi, where she averaged 19.0 points, 12.0 rebounds, 1.8 assists, 1.0 steals, and 36.3 minutes per game.
Frazee suffered a meniscus tear to her left knee in practice on June 25, 2010.  A successful repair on the knee was performed on July 1. She was waived by the Silver Stars on June 29, 2010.

Frazee has played for the following clubs in recent seasons:
2010–11 – Botas (Turkish Women's League);
2011–12 – CCC Polkowice (Polish League);
2012–13 – Samsun (Turkish Women's League);
2013–14 – Ramat HaSharon (Israel – D1); alongside Jacqui Kalin and Laine Selwyn.

References

External links
WNBA Player Profile
Megan Frazee Blog

1987 births
Living people
American expatriate basketball people in Israel
American expatriate basketball people in Poland
American expatriate basketball people in Turkey
American women's basketball players
Basketball players from Texas
Liberty Lady Flames basketball players
People from Laredo, Texas
San Antonio Silver Stars draft picks
San Antonio Stars players
Sportspeople from Xenia, Ohio
Forwards (basketball)